Sasakia is a genus of butterflies in the subfamily Apaturinae of the family Nymphalidae.

Species
Sasakia charonda (Hewitson, 1863)
Sasakia funebris (Leech, 1891) – empress
Sasakia pulcherrima Chou & Li

References

External links
"Sasakia Moore, [1896]" at Markku Savela's Lepidoptera and Some Other Life Forms

Apaturinae
Nymphalidae genera
Taxa named by Frederic Moore